Backstreet Dreams (released as Forever Love in the Philippines) is a 1990 drama film starring Brooke Shields, Jason O'Malley, Sherilyn Fenn and Anthony Franciosa. It was directed by Rupert Hitzig and Jason O'Malley and written by O'Malley.

Plot
Dean, a young hood, and his wife take their disturbed young son, Shane, to a clinic where the boy is diagnosed by Stevie, a psychologist. They discover that the boy is autistic. As the couple's marriage falls apart, Stevie believes she can help Shane as well as possibly help Dean break away from the backstreet dealings that he is living with.

Main cast
Brooke Shields as Stevie
Jason O'Malley as Dean
Anthony Franciosa as Angelo
John Vizzi as Shane
Joseph Vizzi as Shane
Burt Young as Luca
Sherilyn Fenn as Lucy
Tony Fields as Manny
Nick Cassavetes as Mikey
Joe Pantoliano as Paul (Uncredited)

Release
Backstreet Dreams was released in the United States in 1990. In the Philippines, the film was released as Forever Love in January 1992.

References

External links

1990 films
1990 drama films
American drama films
1990s English-language films
Films about autism
Films scored by Bill Conti
Trimark Pictures films
1990s American films
Films about disability